James B. Ricks (December 23, 1852 – June 23, 1906) was an American jurist and politician.

Life and career
Born in Bear Creek Township, Christian County, Illinois, near Taylorville, Illinois, Ricks went to Illinois Wesleyan University 1869 to 1872 and then studied law. In 1874, Ricks was admitted to the Illinois bar. He then practiced law and was involved in the Democratic Party. Ricks was master in chancery for Christian County. In 1899, Ricks served as mayor of Taylorville. From 1901 until his death in 1906, Ricks served on the Illinois Supreme Court. Ricks died of stomach cancer at his home in Taylorville, Illinois.

Notes

1852 births
1906 deaths
Illinois Wesleyan University alumni
Illinois Democrats
Illinois lawyers
Mayors of places in Illinois
Illinois state court judges
Justices of the Illinois Supreme Court
People from Taylorville, Illinois
Deaths from cancer in Illinois
19th-century American judges
Chief Justices of the Illinois Supreme Court